The Sri Lanka cricket team toured Zimbabwe in January 2020 to play two Test matches. It was the first tour of Zimbabwe since the International Cricket Council (ICC) lifted its suspension on Zimbabwe Cricket, due to government interference, in October 2019. Zimbabwe last played Test cricket in November 2018, in a two-match series against Bangladesh. The two teams last played a Test match against each other in July 2017, with Sri Lanka winning by four wickets. Zimbabwe have never beaten Sri Lanka in a Test match. Zimbabwe last played a home Test match in November 2017, against the West Indies.

In December 2019, Sri Lanka Cricket confirmed that the tour would take place following their tour of India. In January 2020, Zimbabwe Cricket confirmed the tour schedule. Zimbabwe Cricket also named Sean Williams as their new Test captain, replacing Hamilton Masakadza who took up the role of Director of Cricket.

Ten days before the first Test, Zimbabwe Cricket named a provisional squad of twenty-five players for the tour. On 15 January 2020, Zimbabwe named their final squad for the tour, which included five players uncapped at Test level. Three of those five cricketers made their debut in the opening day of the first Test of the series, with Brian Mudzinganyama making his Test debut on day four, as a concussion substitute. Mudzinganyama became the first cricketer to make his Test debut as a substitute. Sri Lanka won the match by ten wickets, to take a 1–0 lead in the series. The second Test finished in a draw, therefore Sri Lanka won the series.

Squads

Tinotenda Mutombodzi was added to Zimbabwe's squad for the second Test as a replacement to Kyle Jarvis, who was ruled out due to an injury.

Test series

1st Test

2nd Test

Statistics

Most runs

Most wickets

West Indies cricket team in Sri Lanka in 2019-20

References

External links
 Series home at ESPN Cricinfo

2020 in Sri Lankan cricket
2020 in Zimbabwean cricket
International cricket competitions in 2019–20
Sri Lankan cricket tours of Zimbabwe